The Orange County Fire Authority (OCFA) is the agency that provides fire protection and emergency medical services for unincorporated areas of Orange County, California as well as 25 cities within the county that contract OCFA's services. There are 7 divisions and 11 battalions.

History
Prior to 1980, the Orange County Fire Department, as it was then known, was operated by CAL FIRE under contract.  In May 1980, the Orange County Fire Department was formed to serve the county. Over the next decade, multiple new cities were formed from what had been unincorporated areas of the county. Many of these cities chose to contract with the OCFD for fire services. In 1991 the OCFD began exploring the possibility of reorganizing as a separate agency, first as a Special District and then as a Joint Powers Authority. The County filed for bankruptcy in December 1994, which further encouraged Orange County Fire Department to reorganize as a JPA, known as the Orange County Fire Authority. In 2012 the Orange County Fire Authority absorbed the Santa Ana Fire Department. In, January 2017, OCFA Station 61 in the city of Buena Park Caught fire. Station 61 is just adjacent to the rear of Knotts Berry Farm. The incident occurred around 3 A.M. Engine 61 was en route to a medical emergency at the time but was quickly cancelled when Engine 61 returned. The station was engulfed in flames. No one was injured in the event and all were able to safely escape. A $1,000,000 ladder truck was lost in the blaze, which was the 2006 American Lafrance Truck 61. In 2018, Station 61 was reconstructed on 7440 La Palma Ave, nearly a block away from the old location. In 2019 the OCFA absorbed the Garden Grove Fire Department. Later that year, the City of Placentia, California decided that it would leave the OCFA and create its own fire department, Placentia Fire and Life Safety Department. Placentia, California is the first city to leave the authority.

Stations & equipment

The Operations Department of the OCFA is responsible for directly rendering emergency services to the communities that OCFA serves.  In 2006, OCFA responded to 79,718 incidents within its jurisdiction and 4,084 mutual aid calls. The department is split into seven geographic divisions numbered 1-7 with 11 battalions, each commanded by a battalion chief.
In 2017-2019, OCFA Purchased a large amount of KME Pumpers and 11 KME TDA's, which went to Trucks 4,17,20,22,28,43,45,61,71,75, and 76. In 2020, they also purchased 4 KME 100' RM Ladders, which will go to Trucks 59,49,81,and 85, and 2 WaterTenders( WT 4 and 16), and 3 Type III Brush Engines, which went to E351, E358, and E364.. In 2021, they again, purchased 13 more KME Pumpers. Engine 9 is the first assigned unit to receive the new Pumper. E64, E38, E60, and more are yet to be placed. In May of 2022, all 13 of the KME Pumpers are to be recalled back to KME due issues.

Division 1 
Division 1 is located in the western area of Orange County. It covers the communities of Los Alamitos, Seal Beach, Westminster, Midway City, and Garden Grove;  and the unincorporated communities of Rossmoor, and Sunset Beach. Division 1 is covered by Battalion 1 commanding seven fire stations with Station 2 in Los Alamitos, Station 25 in Midway City, Stations 44 and 48 in Seal Beach and Stations 64, 65 and 66 in Westminster. and Battalion 11 also commanding seven stations covering the city of Garden Grove. The stations in Battalion 11 are Stations 80, 81, 82, 83, 84, 85 and 86 in Garden Grove.

Division 2 
Division 2 is located in the central area of Orange County covering the city of Irvine; along with the John Wayne Airport, and University of California, Irvine. Division 2 covered by Battalion 5 and Battalion 10, each commanding six fire stations. The stations in Battalion 5 are Stations 4, 6, 28, 33, 36 and 47. The stations in Battalion 10 are Stations 20, 26, 27, 38, 51 and 55.

Division 3 

Division 3 is located in the southern and eastern areas of Orange County.  It covers the cities of Dana Point, Laguna Hills, Laguna Niguel, Mission Viejo, Rancho Santa Margarita, San Clemente, and San Juan Capistrano; along with the unincorporated communities of Coto de Caza, Ladera, Las Flores, Modjeska Canyon, and Trabuco Canyon. Division 3 is covered by Battalion 6 and Battalion 7, both commanding seven fire stations. Battalion 6 commands Stations 7, 29, 30, 50, 56, 59, 60 and 67, while Battalion 7 commands Stations 9, 18, 24, 31, 40, 45 and 58.

Division 4 
Division 4 is located in the northern area of Orange County. It covers cities of Tustin, Villa Park, and Yorba Linda along with the unincorporated communities of El Modena, Orange Park Acres, Santiago Canyon, Silverado Canyon, and North Tustin. Division 4 is covered by Battalion 3 commanding eight fire stations and Battalion 2 commanding three fire stations. The stations in Battalion 3 are Stations 8, 14, 15, 16, 21, 23, 37 and 43. The stations in Battalion 2 are Stations 10, 32 and 53. In July 2020, the city of Placentia disbanded from OCFA, decommissioning Station 34 and 35 and removing Engine 34, Truck 34*, USAR 34*, Utility 2* and Engine 35. *Truck 34, USAR 34, and Utility 2 now have been reassigned to Station 32, now Truck 32, USAR 32. Utility 2 was moved also to Station 32, staying as Utility 2. Now Station 32 houses Engine 32, Truck 32, Engine 132, Patrol 32, USAR 32, Utility 2, and Medic 932. Water Tender 32 has since been reassigned back to Water Tender 10, where it was originally assigned before being assigned to Water Tender 32 around 2009 (exact date not available). Battalion 2 was since reassigned from Station 34 to Station 53, then in 2021, moved to station 10.

Division 5 
Division 5 covers the cities of Aliso Viejo, Laguna Hills, Laguna Niguel, Laguna Woods, Lake Forest, Emerald Bay and Mission Viejo. Division 5 is covered by Battalion 4 commanding nine fire stations. These stations are Stations 5, 11, 19, 22, 39, 42, 49, 54 and 57. There are two paramedic engine companies at Station 22.

Division 6 
Division 6 is located in the center area of Orange County, covers the city of Santa Ana and is covered by Battalion 9 commanding ten fire stations. These stations are Stations 70, 71, 72, 73, 74, 75, 76, 77, 78 and 79.

Division 7
Division 7 is located in the western area of Orange County.  It covers the communities of Buena Park, Cypress, La Palma, Stanton and the Air Support Facility at Fullerton Airport. Battalion 8 commands Stations 13, 17, 41, 46, 61, 62 and 63.

See also

Orange County, California
CAL FIRE
Chip Prather

References

External links
 

County government agencies in California
Fire departments in California
Emergency services in Orange County, California
Ambulance services in the United States
Medical and health organizations based in California
1995 establishments in California